White Store Brook is a river in Chenango County, New York. It flows into Unadilla River in White Store.

References

Rivers of New York (state)
Rivers of Chenango County, New York